Trisha is a unisex given name, usually derived from the female Latin given name Patricia.

Notable people and characters with the name include:

People 
Trisha (actress), Indian film actress Trisha Krishnan (born 1983)
Trisha Baptie (born 1973), Canadian anti-prostitution activist
Trisha Brown (1936–2017), American choreographer and dancer, one of the founders of the postmodern dance movement
Trisha Donnelly (born 1974), American conceptual artist
Trisha Goddard (born 1957), British television presenter
Trisha Low, American author and poet
Trisha Noble (born 1944), Australian singer and actress
Trisha Paytas (born 1988), American singer, actress and internet personality
Trisha Yearwood (born 1964), American country singer

Fictional characters 
Trisha Elric, in the Fullmetal Alchemist manga universe
Trisha Thoon, on the US television series Arrested Development

See also
Tricia
Trish

English feminine given names
Hypocorisms
Feminine given names